An Indecent Obsession is a 1981 novel by Australian author Colleen McCullough.

Summary
To the battle-broken soldiers in her care, nurse Honour Langtry is a precious, adored reminder of the world before the war. Then Michael Wilson arrives under a cloud of mystery and shame to change everything. A damaged and decorated hero, a man of secrets and silent pain, soon he alone possesses Honour's selfless heart—inciting tense and volatile passions that can only lead to jealousy, violence, and death.

Film

The novel was turned into a 1985 film.

Cast
Wendy Hughes – Honour Langtry
Gary Sweet – Michael Wilson
Richard Moir – Luce Daggett
Bruno Lawrence – Matt Sawyer
Bill Hunter – Colonel Chinstrap
Julia Blake – Matron

Production
It was shot on location at Lord Howe Island.

Release
The film was released on DVD with a new print by Umbrella Entertainment in April 2013. The DVD includes special features such as the theatrical trailer and exclusive interview with Wendy Hughes.

References

External links

An Indecent Obsession film at Oz Movies
An Indecent Obsession film at Screen Australia
An Indecent Obsession at Letterbox DVD
An Indecent Obsession at BFI

Australian war drama films
1981 novels
Harper & Row books
1985 films
Australian novels adapted into films
Lord Howe Island
Novels by Colleen McCullough
1980s English-language films
1980s Australian films